Batty is a surname and is most commonly found in Yorkshire, northern England. It is derived from Batte, a medieval form of the given name Bartholomew. Notable people with the surname include:

 Basil Batty (1873–1952), Anglican bishop
 Bob Batty (1939–2004), Australian rugby league footballer
 David Batty (born 1968), English former association (soccer) footballer
 De Witt Batty (1879–1961), English-born Bishop of Newcastle, New South Wales, Australia (1931–58)
 Emily Batty (born 1988), Canadian racing cyclist
 Fred Batty (1934–2007), English footballer
 Gareth Batty (born 1977), English cricketer
 Grant Batty (born 1951), New Zealand former rugby union footballer
 Jane Batty (born 1946), Canadian politician
 Jason Batty (born 1971), retired New Zealand footballer
 Jeremy Batty (born 1971), English cricketer
 Jonathan Batty (born 1974), English cricketer
 Kenneth Batty (born 1945), English former rugby league footballer
 Nathan Batty (born 1982), English rugby league footballer
 Paul Batty (born 1964), English former association (soccer) footballer
 Robert Batty (artist) (1789–1848), English army officer and artist
 Robert Batty (physician) (1763–1849), English physician, father of the above
 Ron Batty (1925–1971), English footballer
 Rosie Batty (born 1962), 2015 Australian of the Year
 Ross Batty (born 1986), English rugby union player
 Seán Batty (born 1982), Scottish weather presenter

Fictional characters include:
 Roy Batty, from the science fiction film Blade Runner
 Nora Batty, from the British sitcom Last of the Summer Wine
 Wally Batty, from Last of the Summer Wine
 Professor Batty, in the comic book story Flip Decision

See also 
 Battey
 Batty (video game)
 Batty Bay
 Batty boy, sexual slur
 Battye

Surnames of British Isles origin
English-language surnames
Patronymic surnames